This is a list of Alpha Sigma Phi fraternity chapters and provisional chapters. Groups are listed generally in order according of the date they chartered into Alpha Sigma Phi. In the case of full merger partners, these are ordered by date of entry into , but their chartering dates reflect the dates of their original charter into their earlier national bodies. 
Active chapters and provisional chapters noted in bold, inactive chapters noted in italics. Multiple chapters came from several  merger partners. The dates of any predecessor local organization(s) are provided in reference notes. Where no predecessor local is named it may be understood the group came from a colony (or, from 2016 a provisional chapter). 

Note, the term "colony" was changed to "provisional chapter" at the  Grand Chapter.

Notes

References

Alpha Sigma Phi
chapters